Liberal Samajbadi Party is a political party in Nepal. The party was registered with the Election Commission of Nepal ahead of the 2008 Constituent Assembly election. Its registration was cancelled in 2016.

References

2008 establishments in Nepal
Liberal parties in Asia
Liberal socialism
Political parties established in 2008
Socialist parties in Nepal